The Bosnian Mountain Horse (Bosnian: Bosanski brdski konj / Босански брдски коњ) is the only indigenous breed of domestic horse in Bosnia and Herzegovina, where it constitutes about 70% of the horse population. It is a small horse and is used both as a pack animal and for riding. Breed numbers were severely reduced during the Bosnian War of 1992–1995, and, unlike populations of other farm animals, continued to fall after the end of the war.

History

Selective breeding of the Bosnian Mountain Horse began at the stud of Goražde in 1908. The principal centres for the selection of the breed were the stud farms of Borike, in the municipality of Rogatica, and Han Pijesak. Three stallion lines – Agan, Barut and Miško – and nine mare lines were established; the Agan line is lost, and the Barut and Miško lines heavily mixed. Arab stallions at the Borike stud were used to improve the Bosnian Mountain Horse. 

There are two types within the breed. The Glasinacki type has substantial Arab influence; it is named after the plateau of Glasinac on the Romanija mountain, in the eastern part of the Republika Srpska. A smaller type, the Podveleški, is found in Herzegovina.

During the Bosnian War of 1992–1995 horse populations, like those of other farm animals, suffered heavily. Overall, horse numbers in Bosnia and Herzegovina fell by 68% between 1990 and 2002.

The breed has not been substantially affected by importations of foreign horses. It is in some areas the principal, or even the only, means of transportation.

References

Further reading

 Enver Žiga, Refik Telalbašič (2008). Bosanski brdski konj: monografija = The Bosnian Mountain Horse - monograph. Sarajevo: TKD Šahinpašic.
 Gertrud Grilz-Seger, Thomas Druml (2015). Das Bosnische Gebirgspferd. Graz: Vehling Verlag GmbH. .
 Refik Telalbašić, Enver Žiga, Alma Rahmanović (2011). Matična knjiga Bosanskog brdskog konja. Sarajevo: TKD Šahinpašić. .

Horse breeds originating in Bosnia and Herzegovina
Horse breeds